The 2011 All England Open Badminton Championships was the third super series tournament of the 2011 BWF Super Series. It was the second competition under the new format where a select group of Super Series events were elevated to premier status. The tournament was held in Birmingham, England from 8–13 March 2011 and had a total purse of $350,000.

Men's singles

Seeds

  Lee Chong Wei (Champion)
  Taufik Hidayat
  Lin Dan
  Peter Gade
  Chen Long
  Chen Jin
  Nguyễn Tiến Minh
  Boonsak Ponsana

Top half

Bottom half

Finals

Women's singles

Seeds

  Wang Shixian
  Wang Yihan
  Wang Xin
  Tine Baun
  Saina Nehwal
  Jiang Yanjiao
  Juliane Schenk
  Bae Youn-joo

Top half

Bottom half

Finals

Men's doubles

Seeds

  Mathias Boe / Carsten Mogensen
  Ko Sung-hyun / Yoo Yeon-seong
  Jung Jae-sung / Lee Yong-dae
  Markis Kido / Hendra Setiawan
  Koo Kien Keat / Tan Boon Heong
  Cai Yun / Fu Haifeng
  Fang Chieh-min / Lee Sheng-mu
  Muhammad Ahsan / Bona Septano

Top half

Bottom half

Finals

Women's doubles

Seeds

  Cheng Wen-hsing / Chien Yu-chin
  Miyuki Maeda / Satoko Suetsuna
  Wang Xiaoli / Yu Yang
  Duanganong Aroonkesorn / Kunchala Voravichitchaikul
  Petya Nedelcheva /  Anastasia Russkikh
  Valeria Sorokina / Nina Vislova
  Meiliana Jauhari / Greysia Polii
  Shinta Mulia Sari / Yao Lei

Top half

Bottom half

Finals

Mixed doubles

Seeds

  Zhang Nan / Zhao Yunlei
  Thomas Laybourn / Kamilla Rytter Juhl
  Sudket Prapakamol / Saralee Thoungthongkam
  Robert Mateusiak / Nadiezda Zieba
  Tao Jiaming / Tian Qing
  Ko Sung-hyun / Ha Jung-eun
  Tantowi Ahmad / Lilyana Natsir
  Chen Hung-ling / Cheng Wen-hsing

Top half

Bottom half

Finals

References

External links
Official website

2011 All England Super Series Premier
All England Super Series Premier
All England Premier
Sports competitions in Birmingham, West Midlands
March 2011 sports events in the United Kingdom